Wayne Robson (April 29, 1946 – April 4, 2011) was a Canadian television, stage, voice and film actor known for playing the part of Mike Hamar, an ex-convict and sometime thief, on the Canadian sitcom The Red Green Show from 1993 to 2006, as well as in the 2002 film Duct Tape Forever.

Robson was also known as the escape artist character Rennes, "the Wren", from the 1997 science fiction film Cube. He was in the episode “A Miracle of a Rare Device” on The Ray Bradbury Theater in 1989.

Background
Robson was born in Vancouver, British Columbia. He began his acting career on stage there, but moved with his family to Toronto, Ontario, where he continued stage acting and appeared in Canadian television commercials in the 1970s. After receiving several small character roles in films such as McCabe & Mrs. Miller (1971) and Popeye (1980), Robson starred in the 1984 film The Grey Fox for which he was nominated for a Genie Award for Best Supporting Actor.

Robson voiced Bloom in the cartoon Pippi Longstocking and Matthew Cuthbert in Anne of Green Gables: The Animated Series. He also voiced Professor Cuthbert Calculus on The Adventures of Tintin between 1991 and 1992, and voiced Melvin Fish in the animated series Bob and Margaret. Robson played minor characters in such films as Finders Keepers (1984), One Magic Christmas (1985), Parents (1989), Frank on The Rescuers Down Under (1990), Double, Double, Toil and Trouble (1993), Dolores Claiborne (1995), Two If by Sea (1996), Cube (1997), Wrong Turn (2003), Welcome to Mooseport (2004), The Incredible Hulk (2008), and Survival of the Dead (2009).

He appeared as Christie in the TV movie The Diviners (1993) based on the Governor General's Award-winning novel by Margaret Laurence, and as Holly Hunter's ailing father, Tug Jones, in the TV movie Harlan County War (2000). Robson was nominated and won several Gemini Awards. He appeared in TV series and miniseries The New Twilight Zone, The Good Germany, Puppets Who Kill, Relic Hunter, and Lexx.

Death
Robson died while in rehearsals for The Grapes of Wrath at the Stratford Festival in Stratford, Ontario, Canada on April 4, 2011 from a heart attack, a few weeks before his 65th birthday.

His son, Louis McKeen Robson (b. 1991), who did a part on The Red Green Show with his father, died on December 25, 2016, aged 25.

Selected filmography

McCabe & Mrs. Miller (1971) – Bartender
Russian Roulette (1975) – Mechanic (uncredited)
Popeye (1980) – Chizzelflint, the Pawnbroker
Improper Channels (1981) – Prisoner
The Grey Fox (1982) – Shorty
Finders Keepers (1984) – Zev Tyndale
Just the Way You Are (1984) – Theater Assistant Manager
Mrs. Soffel (1984) – Halliday
One Magic Christmas (1985) – Harry Dickens
Bullies (1986) – Vern
Dead of Winter (1987) – Officer Huntley
Candy Mountain (1987) – Buddy Burke
Housekeeping (1987) – Principal
And Then You Die (1987) – Wally Degan
Goofballs (1987) – Stick
Something About Love (1988) – Myles
Parents (1989) – Lab Attendant
Buying Time (1989) – Rolley
Bye Bye Blues (1989) – Pete
Justice Denied (1989) – Roy Ebsary
Love & Murder (1990) – Jeff
Dark Horse (1990) – Elliot
The Rescuers Down Under (1990) – Frank the Lizard (voice)
Bingo (1991) – Four Eyes
Double, Double, Toil and Trouble (1993, TV Movie) – Gravedigger
April One (1994) – Wayne Brock
Dolores Claiborne (1995) – Sammy Marchant
Goosebumps (1995) - Jimmy O'James
National Lampoon's Senior Trip (1995) – Frank Hardin
Two If by Sea (1996) – Beano Callahan
Getting Away with Murder (1996) – Bartender
Pippi Longstocking (1997) – Bloom (voice)
Affliction (1997) – Nick Wickham
Cube (1997) – Rennes
Babar: King of the Elephants (1999) – Marabou / Sales Manager (voice)
Redwall (1999) - Methuselah (voice)
The Highwayman (2000) – Cruickshank
Lexx (2000) - Gubby Mok
Anne of Green Gables: The Animated Series (2000) – Matthew Cuthbert (voice)
Duct Tape Forever (2002) – Mike Hamar
Mark Twain's Roughing It (2002) – Mr. Ballau
Interstate 60 (2002) – Tolbert (Deep Stomach)
Wrong Turn (2003) – Maynard Odets
Cold Creek Manor (2003) – Stan Holland
Welcome to Mooseport (2004) – Morris Gutman
Miss Spider's Sunny Patch Friends (2004-2006, TV Series) - Mr Mantis (voice)
Stuck (2007) – Mr. Binckley
Wrong Turn 2: Dead End (2007) – Maynard Odets
In Between (2007) – Professor
The Incredible Hulk (2008) – Boat Captain
The Timekeeper (2009) – Lomacki
Survival of the Dead (2009) – Tawdry
Servitude (2011) – Donny (final film role)

References

External links

1946 births
2011 deaths
Male actors from Vancouver
Canadian male film actors
Canadian male stage actors
Canadian male voice actors
Canadian male television actors
Best Supporting Actor in a Drama Series Canadian Screen Award winners